The Silver Darlings is a 1947 British film about Scottish fishermen, based on a 1941 novel by Neil M. Gunn.

The film is set in the early 19th century and after the highland clearances. Catrine and her family, like many other dispossessed Scots, turn their hands to Herring fishing (the so-called Silver Darlings of the title). Catrine's husband is press-ganged into the Royal Navy and dies at sea. Catrine is left widowed with a young son to raise.

After some time, Roddy proposes to Catrine, but her son Finn, now older, is very upset about the engagement and everyone is trying to avoid conscription into the Royal Navy.

Cast

 Clifford Evans as Roddy
 Helen Shingler as Catrine
 Carl Bernard as Angus
 Norman Shelley as Hendry
 Simon Lack as Don
 Norman Williams as Tormad
 Murdo Morrison as Finn (adult)
 Josephine Stewart as Una (adult)
 Hugh Griffith as Packman
 Carole Lesley as Una (Child)
 Christoper Capon as Finn (child)
 Stanley Jay as Bo'sun
 Harry Fine as Lieutenant
 Iris Vandeleur as Kirsty
 Jean Shepherd as Mrs Hendry
 Bennett O'Loghlin as Callum
 Jack Faint as Skipper Bremner
 Wilfred Caithness as first Crofter
 Michael Martin-Harvey as second Crofter
 Anne Allan as Meg
 Phema Clyne as Marie
 Peter Illing as Foreign Buyer
 Roddy Hughes as Shoemaker
 Hamilton Deane as Professor
 Kenneth Warrington as Doctor
 Phyllis Morris as Tormad's mother

References

External links
The Silver Darlings at IMDb

1947 films
British drama films
1947 drama films
British black-and-white films
Films scored by Clifton Parker
1940s British films